Cédric Leandre Tchoumbé Fankam (born 28 March 1987), commonly known as Cédric Tchoumbé, is a Cameroonian footballer who plays as a striker.

References

External links

Cédric Tchoumbé - footnational
Cédric Tchoumbé - footmercato.net

1987 births
Living people
Footballers from Douala
French sportspeople of Cameroonian descent
Cameroonian footballers
French footballers
Cameroonian expatriate footballers
Association football forwards
FC Oberneuland players
RWS Bruxelles players
Louhans-Cuiseaux FC players
S.C. Espinho players
C.D. Feirense players
Sur SC players
That Ras Club players
Abha Club players
Liga Portugal 2 players
Oman Professional League players
Saudi First Division League players
Expatriate footballers in Italy
French expatriate sportspeople in Italy
Expatriate footballers in Spain
French expatriate sportspeople in Spain
Expatriate footballers in Germany
French expatriate sportspeople in Germany
Expatriate footballers in Belgium
French expatriate sportspeople in Belgium
Expatriate footballers in Switzerland
French expatriate sportspeople in Switzerland
Expatriate footballers in Portugal
French expatriate sportspeople in Portugal
Expatriate footballers in Oman
French expatriate sportspeople in Oman
Expatriate footballers in Jordan
French expatriate sportspeople in Jordan
Expatriate footballers in Saudi Arabia
Cameroonian expatriate sportspeople in Saudi Arabia